West Chatfield Beach is a hamlet in the Canadian province of Saskatchewan.

Demographics 

References

Designated places in Saskatchewan
Meota No. 468, Saskatchewan
Organized hamlets in Saskatchewan